Omphalea celata is a rare plant species found in Queensland, Australia.

References

celata
Flora of Queensland
Taxa named by Paul Irwin Forster